Now's Your Chance is a Canadian variety talent show television series which aired on CBC Television from year 1952 to 1954.

Premise
This series featured new, non-established talent. It was produced at CBC Toronto as one of the first productions of CBC Television.

Scheduling
This half-hour series was broadcast on Thursdays at 8:00 p.m. (Eastern) from 11 September 1952 to 6 May 1954.

See also
 Canadian Idol

References

External links
 

CBC Television original programming
1950s Canadian variety television series
1952 Canadian television series debuts
1954 Canadian television series endings
Black-and-white Canadian television shows